Dhosi is a village in Khetri subdistrict, Jhunjhunu district, Rajasthan, India.

Demographics/Population of 2011
As of 2011 India census, Dhosi had a population of 1543 in 321 households. Males (786) constitute 50.93%  of the population and females (757) 49.06%. Dhosi has an average literacy (1032) rate of 66.88%, lower than the national average of 74%: male literacy (630) is 61.04%, and female literacy (402) is 38.95% of total literates (1032). In Dhosi, 11.34% of the population is under 6 years of age (175). dhosi has now population of 873 males and 842 females.

See also
 Dhosi Hill

References

Villages in Jhunjhunu district